The 2015–16 Marquette Golden Eagles women's basketball team represented Marquette University in the 2015–16 college basketball season. The Golden Eagles, led by second year head coach Carolyn Kieger, are members of the Big East Conference. The Golden Eagles play their home games at the Al McGuire Center. They finished the season 14–16, 9–9 in Big East play to finish in a tie for fifth place. They lost in quarterfinals of the Big East women's tournament to Seton Hall.

Roster

Schedule

|-
!colspan=9 style="background:#00386D; color:#FDBB30;"|Exhibition

|-
!colspan=9 style="background:#00386D; color:#FDBB30;"| Non-conference regular season

|-
!colspan=9 style="background:#00386D; color:#FDBB30;"| Big East regular season

|-
!colspan=9 style="background:#00386D; color:#FDBB30;"| Big East  Women's Tournament

See also
2015–16 Marquette Golden Eagles men's basketball team

References

Marquette
Marquette Golden Eagles women's basketball seasons
Marquette
Marquette